John Joseph Killion (February 9, 1859 – December 22, 1937), more commonly known as Jake Kilrain, was a famous American bare-knuckle fighter and glove boxer of the 1880s.

Early life 

Kilrain found employment as a teenager in Somerville, Massachusetts. As a country boy from Long Island, he had to learn how to stand up to the workers in the rolling mills. By the age of 20, he had been recognized as the toughest fighter in the mill. Kilrain was also a champion rower having won the National Amateur Junior Sculling Championship in 1883. He was later stripped of that honor when it was discovered that he was a prizefighter and thus could not be considered an amateur.

In 1883, Kilrain took up prizefighting as a profession and quickly established a reputation as a very tough fighter.

Professional career

World Championship fight with Jem Smith 
By 1887 Kilrain already has been recognized as the U.S. National Champion, that gave him an opportunity to fight for the Championship of the World and silver belt versus the British Champion Jem Smith, scheduled to take place in December 1887, in France, at a little island on the River Seine, called St. Pierre d'Autils. The bout was attended by about a hundred of the upper class spectators and journalists, mainly from England, being covered by the major international media of the day, such as Reuters, Gaulois, etc. They fought 1-minute rounds with 30 seconds break between the rounds. At the outset the men fought evenly. After the 3rd round Kilrain scored several knockdowns, and wrestling formed the principal mode of operations for the rest of the fight. Before the 106th round had started, after two hours and a half of fighting (roughly three times the full duration of modern-day 12-round championship fights,) when darkness set in, the bout was stopped due to technical reasons, as no artificial lighting of the scene has been arranged the outcome was called a draw due to darkness.

Clearly dominant throughout the fight (even the English newspapers wrote that "the Englishman was no match for the American crack",) upon his return to the United States, Kilrain was pronounced by Richard K. Fox of the National Police Gazette as Heavyweight Champion of the World for his bout with Jem Smith. The awarding of the belt to Kilrain was part of a strategy by Fox to draw Sullivan into a fight. Any remote claim he had to the title of world champion was lost in 1889 after his loss to John L. Sullivan.

Bout with John L. Sullivan 

Kilrain is perhaps best known for challenging champion John L. Sullivan in 1889 in the last world heavyweight championship prizefight decided with bare knuckles under London Prize Ring rules in history. They fought 1-minute rounds with 50 seconds break between the rounds. In a hard-fought contest, Kilrain lost at the start of the 76th round (after 2 hours 16 minutes) when Mike Donovan, his second, threw in the sponge. Kilrain had not wanted to give up thinking that he could outlast Sullivan, but Donovan defended his actions insisting that Kilrain would have died had the fight gone on. In any case, the Kilrain-Sullivan fight can rightly be listed among the greatest fights of the pre-modern era.

Later career 

Kilrain continued on for 10 more years after the Sullivan fight with gloves under Marquess of Queensberry rules with some success.  His most significant win was a 44-round knockout of Boston's George Godfrey in 1891. He retired with a record of 18 wins (3 by KO), 6 losses and 12 draws along with 1 non-decision. He lived in his later years as a devoted family man with his wife and children as proprietor of a saloon in Baltimore, Maryland. After his saloon burned down, he moved back to Somerville and was given a job with the parks department. After government cutbacks during the Great Depression he became a night watchman at a Quincy, Massachusetts shipyard.

In his later life, Kilrain became good friends with John L. Sullivan. When Sullivan died in 1918, Kilrain served as a pallbearer at the funeral. He was also godfather to the English boxer Charley Mitchell's son Charles Mitchell.

Death and honors
Kilrain died on December 22, 1937, in a local hospital from complications of old age and diabetes, aged 78.

Kilrain was elected to the Bare Knuckle Boxing Hall of Fame in 2009 and to the International Boxing Hall of Fame in 2012.

Scottish boxer and welterweight champion Henry Owens would later fight under the name "Jake Kilrain".

Professional boxing record
All information in this section is derived from BoxRec, unless otherwise stated.

Official record

All newspaper decisions are officially regarded as “no decision” bouts and are not counted in the win/loss/draw column.

Unofficial record

Record with the inclusion of newspaper decisions in the win/loss/draw column.

References

External links
 In the Shadow of John L. Sullivan

|-

1859 births
1937 deaths
Bare-knuckle boxers
Heavyweight boxers
Sportspeople from Somerville, Massachusetts
American male boxers
Deaths from diabetes